John Marian D'Souza was an Indian politician from Goa. He was a former member of the Goa, Daman and Diu Legislative Assembly, representing the Calangute Assembly constituency from 1963 to 1967. He was a member of the United Goans Party.

Career
D'Souza contested in the 1963 Goa, Daman and Diu Legislative Assembly election from the Calangute Assembly constituency on the United Goans Party and emerged victorious by defeating Maharashtrawadi Gomantak Party candidate by a majority of 1,702 votes. He was then succeeded by Valente Sequeira as the member of the constituency .

References

Year of birth unknown
20th-century Indian politicians
People from Goa
Goan people
People from North Goa district
Goa, Daman and Diu MLAs 1963–1967